= Michael Ogbere =

Nigerian politician

Deputy Speaker of the Bayelsa State House of Assembly
- In office 2020–incumbent
- Constituency: Ekeremor Constituency III

Personal details
- Party: Peoples Democratic Party (until 2025); All Progressives Congress (since 2025)

Michael Ogbere is a Nigerian politician serving as the Deputy Speaker of the Bayelsa State House of Assembly.

He represents Ekeremor Constituency III. Ogbere was first elected to the state assembly in 2019 and was re-elected in 2023. He has held the position of Deputy Speaker since 2020.

== Political career ==
Ogbere represents Ekeremor Constituency III in the Bayelsa State House of Assembly. In 2020, he was elected Deputy Speaker of the House. He was re-elected to the assembly in the 2023 Bayelsa State House of Assembly election and continued as Deputy Speaker.

== Political affiliation ==
Ogbere was a member of the Peoples Democratic Party (PDP). In October 2025, he reportedly joined the All Progressives Congress (APC) along with other Bayelsa legislators.

== See also ==
- Bayelsa State House of Assembly
